DEBS may refer to:
Double-entry bookkeeping system
Distributed Event-Based Systems Conference
DEBS (6-deoxyerythronolide B synthase)

D.E.B.S. may refer to:
D.E.B.S. (2003 film), the short film that garnered seven film festival awards
D.E.B.S. (2004 film), the feature-length film spawned by the short film of the same name